Polytechnics Canada is a national non-profit association representing 13 leading research-intensive, publicly funded polytechnics, colleges and institutes of technology. Located in Canada’s key economic regions, the members of Polytechnics Canada are: British Columbia Institute of Technology (BCIT), Kwantlen Polytechnic University (KPU), Northern Alberta Institute of Technology (NAIT), Southern Alberta Institute of Technology (SAIT), Saskatchewan Polytechnic, Red River College Polytechnic (RRC Polytech), Fanshawe College, Conestoga College, Sheridan Institute of Technology and Advanced Learning, Humber College Institute of Technology and Advanced Learning, George Brown College, Seneca College and Algonquin College.

Polytechnics Canada focuses on three main areas of federal policy advocacy:

 Research and innovation
 Skills and talent development
 Diversity and inclusion

In 2020-21, the association's 13 members served over 370,000 for-credit students, with 100% of polytechnic programs are built around an experiential component or model.

The association’s members have strength across a variety of credentials, offering:

 More than 210 stand-alone bachelor’s degrees
 More than 1000 diploma programs
 Nearly 650 certificate programs
 More than 400 graduate certificates
 Nearly 270 apprenticeship programs
 Nearly 20,000 continuing education courses

Polytechnics Canada’s members are providers of applied research. In 2020-21, they conducted 3,720 applied research projects, serving 2,600 partners and engaging 3,200 students.

History
Polytechnics Canada was established in 2003 by eight Canadian colleges, polytechnics and institutes of technology. The original founding members are BCIT, Conestoga College, George Brown College, Humber College, NAIT, SAIT, Seneca College and Sheridan. In recent years, Red River College Polytechnic, Saskatchewan Polytechnic, Kwantlen Polytechnic University, Algonquin College and Fanshawe College have joined as members.

Members

See also
Higher education in Canada
List of colleges in Ontario
List of colleges in Alberta
List of colleges in British Columbia

References

External links

Educational organizations based in Ontario
Vocational education in Canada
College and university associations and consortia in Canada